This article is a list of notable people from the Australian regional city of Toowoomba, Queensland.

General
 

 Dallas Angguish (author and academic)
 Douglas Annand (designer)
 Don Bennett (1930s long-distance pilot, WWII leader of Atlantic Ferry Command and the RAF "Pathfinders")
 Leonard John Brass (botanist)
 Phil Cass (comedy entertainer and magician)
 Harry Chauvel (first Australian soldier to attain the rank of Lieutenant General, Australian Imperial Force)
 Frank Forde (politician, 15th Prime Minister of Australia)
 Don Featherstone (filmmaker)
 Gina Jeffreys (country singer)
 Sidney Jeffryes (radio operator, Australasian Antarctic Expedition 1911–1914)
 Sonia Kruger (Big Brother Australia presenter, 2012–present)
 Meshel Laurie (TV personality)
 Frank Riethmuller (German–Australian rose breeder)
 Steele Rudd (Arthur Hoey Davis) (author best known for On Our Selection)
 Don Talbot (historical author, mainly of local and Queensland histories)
 Kosta Theodosis (musician)
 Penelope Wensley (diplomat and Governor of Queensland)

Acting
 
 
 Jason Gann (actor, known for playing Wilfred in the Australian TV show of the same name)
 Judy Morris (actress, film director, screenwriter: Happy Feet and Babe)
 Geoffrey Rush (Academy Award-winning actor)
 Shane Withington (actor)
 Alec Snow (actor, known for playing Matt Page in Neighbours)
 Charlotte Chimes (actress, known for playing Nicolette Stone in Neighbours)

Science
 

 Peter Cameron (mathematician)
Craig Hawker (polymer chemist and materials scientist)
 Elizabeth Kenny (pioneer in polio treatment and physiotherapy)
 Cheryl Praeger (mathematician)
 Don Syme (designer and creator of the F Sharp programming language)

Sports
 
 
 Peter Bol (South Sudanese Australian Olympian)
 Michael Brennan (hockey player)
 Adam Brideson (Rugby League player)
 Sandy Campbell (Rugby League player)
 Ross Case (former tennis player)
 Tim Cuddihy (Olympic archer)
 John Dorge (former National Basketball League player)
 Suzie Faulkner (hockey player)
 Nathan Friend (Rugby League player)
 Jared Graves (Olympic BMX rider)
 Natalie Grinham and Rachael Grinham (top Women's World Squash ranking)
 Eric Harris (Rugby League footballer of the 1920s and 1930s for Western Suburbs and Leeds)
 Tim Horan (Rugby Union player)
 Brad Howard (Australian Rules football player)
 Nikki Hudson (hockey player)
 Geraint Jones (English cricketer)
 Michael Katsidis (professional boxer)
 Jason Little (Rugby Union player)
 Martin Love (Australian Cricketer)
 Alexander Mayes (cricketer)
 Paul McCabe (Rugby League player)
 Fabian "Fabe" McCarthy (Rugby Union player)
 John McDonald (Rugby League player and administrator)
 Phil Morwood (Rugby League player) 
 Hope Munro (hockey player)
 Glynis Nunn (heptathlete)
 Robbie O'Davis (Rugby League Player)
 Cory Paix (Rugby League player) 
 Nick Paterson (Rugby League player) 
 Will Power (Indycar Driver, 2014 and 2022 Indycar Series champion, 2018 Indianapolis 500 Winner)
 Steve Price (Rugby League player)
 Greg Ritchie (former Queensland and Australian cricketer)
 Karla Reuter (former Olympian/ Australian Representative for Women's Soccer)
 Samson Ryan (AFL player)
 Chloe Sims (gymnast)
 Angie Skirving (hockey player)
 Karen Smith (hockey player)
 Peter Sterling (Rugby League player)
 Ash Taylor (Rugby League player)
 Johnathan Thurston (Rugby League player)
 Patrick Tiernan (distance runner)
 Ben Walker (Rugby League player)
 Jack Wildermuth (Cricket Player)
 Michael Witt (Rugby League player)

References

External links

 Toowoomba.org - Toowoomba's Homepage

Toowoomba

Toowoomba